Christian Day (born 24 June 1983) is a retired rugby union player who last played for Northampton Saints in the Aviva Premiership. His position of choice was lock.

Rugby
Day played for Sale, and also had a short spell at French giants Stade Français. In the 2005–2006 season, Day played as a replacement in the final as Sale Sharks won their first ever Premiership title.

Joining Northampton Saints in 2008, Day went on to rack up 232 appearances for the Midlands side. In that time, Day helped Saints to lift the Aviva Premiership , European Rugby Challenge Cup twice and the Premiership Cup.

In January 2015 he was called up to the senior England squad by Stuart Lancaster, but was ultimately never capped at that level.

Holding the post of the Chairman of the Rugby Players' Association since 2014, Day was named Players' Player of the Season in that double-winning season by his Saints peers. Day stepped down from his position as the Chairman of the Rugby Players' Association in November 2017, handing the role to Harlequins prop Mark Lambert. Day assumed the Vice-President role for the 2017/18 season.

Most recently Day was amongst the squad that helped Saints' second team the Northampton Wanderers clinch the 2016/17 Aviva 'A' League trophy, though was not in the side for the final against Gloucester United.

On 19 April 2018 Day announced that he would be retiring from professional rugby at the end of the 17/18 season. His professional career spanned 17 years, the bulk of which he spent with Northampton Saints. Christian will go on to take a full-time role at the RPA as their player liaison officer.

In January 2023, Day was elected General Secretary of the RPA, following an election.

Personal
In March 2020, Day appeared on the general public edition of BBC TV cookery competition MasterChef, progressing to the final 7 before being eliminated after making a vital error in the eyes of the judges twice.

He has two children, Anna and Emily.

References

External links
ESPN Scrum profile

1983 births
Living people
Sale Sharks players
Stade Français players
Northampton Saints players